Luis Arnulfo Gini Jara (born October 31, 1935 in Piribebuy), is a Paraguayan football defender who played for Paraguay in the 1958 FIFA World Cup. He also played for Club Sol de América.

References

External links
FIFA profile

Paraguayan footballers
Paraguay international footballers
Association football defenders
Club Sol de América footballers
1958 FIFA World Cup players
1935 births
Living people